2020 The Citadel Bulldogs baseball team represents The Citadel in the 2020 NCAA Division I baseball season.  The Bulldogs play their home games at Joseph P. Riley Jr. Park in Charleston, South Carolina. The team is coached by Tony Skole, in his 3rd season at The Citadel.

Previous season
The Bulldogs struggled to a 12–43 overall record, just 5–19 in the Southern Conference.  They were eliminated in the play-in round of the 2019 Southern Conference baseball tournament by Western Carolina

Personnel

Roster

Coaches

Schedule

References

Citadel
The Citadel Bulldogs baseball seasons
Citadel baseball